Weaver of Dreams is an album by guitarist Kenny Burrell recorded in 1960 and 1961 and originally released on the Columbia label. The album features Burrell's vocal talents as well as his guitar playing.

Reception

Allmusic awarded the album 3 stars.

Track listing 
All compositions by Kenny Burrell except as indicated
 "I'll Buy You a Star" (Dorothy Fields, Arthur Schwartz) - 2:11   
 "Weaver of Dreams" (Jack Elliott, Victor Young) - 2:28   
 "The More I See You" (Harry Warren, Mack Gordon) - 2:52   
 "I'm Just a Lucky So-and-So" (Duke Ellington, Mack David) - 2:56   
 "A Fine Romance" (Jerome Kern, Dorothy Fields) - 2:04   
 "Until the Real Thing Comes Along" (Mann Holiner, Alberta Nichols, Sammy Cahn, Saul Chaplin, L.E. Freeman) - 3:04
 "The Blues is Awful Mean" - 2:38   
 "That Old Feeling" (Sammy Fain, Lew Brown) - 3:29   
 "If I Had You" (Jimmy Campbell, Reg Connelly, Ted Shapiro) - 2:08   
 "Hootchie-Koo" - 3:58   
 "Afternoon in Paris" (John Lewis) - 4:19   
 "Like Someone in Love" (Johnny Burke, Jimmy Van Heusen) - 2:12

Personnel 
Kenny Burrell - guitar, vocals
Bobby Jaspar - tenor saxophone
Tommy Flanagan - piano
Joe Benjamin, Wendell Marshall - bass
Bill English, Bobby Donaldson - drums

References 

Kenny Burrell albums
1961 albums
Columbia Records albums
Albums produced by John Hammond (producer)